Original Sun Sound of Johnny Cash is a compilation album by American singer-songwriter Johnny Cash. It was released in 1964 by Sun Records after Cash had left the label and signed with Columbia Records. The album is made up of songs Cash recorded for Sun prior to leaving the label. The album was re-issued in 2003 with 5 bonus tracks. These tracks are alternate or incomplete takes of songs that were already on the album.

Track listing

References

1964 albums
Johnny Cash albums
Sun Records albums
Albums produced by Sam Phillips